Christ Lutheran High School is a high school located in Buckley, Illinois.  For the 2011–2012 school year, the enrollment was 26. The school employs three teachers, two support staff, and one administrator.

References

Private high schools in Illinois
Lutheran schools in Illinois
Schools in Iroquois County, Illinois
Secondary schools affiliated with the Lutheran Church–Missouri Synod